Here Come the Mummies (HCTM) is an American funk rock band best known for its live performances and anonymous band members.

The band consists of various professional musicians based in Nashville, Tennessee. There are rumored to be several Grammy awards among the members, though this is difficult to verify, as the identities of band members are kept "under wraps."  Members are believed to be under contract to various record labels, hiding their identities so as to prevent contract disputes while performing.

According to the band's humorous promotional material: "Some say [the band was] cursed after deflowering a great Pharaoh's daughter. Others claim they are reincarnated Grammy-Winning studio musicians. Regardless, HCTM's mysterious personas, cunning song-craft, and unrelenting live show will bend your brain, and melt your face."

Style and influences 

Here Come the Mummies' music is funk rock that incorporates elements of jazz, soul, ska and reggae. The band's influences include Otis Redding, Sly and the Family Stone, Stevie Wonder, Commodores and Kool & the Gang. The band's appearance may have been inspired by the garage rock band The Mummies, who also performed in bandages.

Members

Current 
Current members of the band are:
Mummy Cass – Guitar, Lead vocals
Eddie Mummy – Drums, Vocals
Spaz – Keyboards, Vocals
K.W. Tut – Bass, Vocals
The Pole! – Bass
Midnight Mummy – Baritone Sax, Tenor Sax, Flute, Trombone, Keytar, Percussion, Vocals
The Flu – Alto Sax, Clarinet, Flute
Ra – Tenor Sax
High Priest of Death (HPOD) – Trumpet
(Dr.) Mummy Yo – Baritone Sax, Tenor Sax, Alto Sax, Sousaphone, Flute
Mummy Highlander – Saxophone (alternate)
Motherlode – Saxophone (alternate)
Mummy Lingus - Saxophone (alternate)
The Great Grabsby - Saxophone (alternate)

Former 
Former members of the band are:
Flava Mummy – Percussion, Vocals
Oozie Mummy – Trumpet, Vocals
Teste Verde – Trumpet
Bucking Blanco – Trumpet
Ramses Mummy – Bass
Hoser – Saxophone
Java Mummy – Percussion, Vocals: Java (born 1974 B.C. as J Mummy Love)
 Will Pharaoh – Trumpet
Tito Mummy – Trumpet
B.B. Queen – Trumpet
Gold Member - Trumpet
Jo Jo Ma - Saxophone
Bone Air - Trombone
Boy Algae - Trombone
The Slide - Trombone
Maximum Mummy - Trombone
Snatchmo
Two-zie Mummy
The Probe
Sousa Claus
Octoberfist
Patches
Goldfinger
Miracle Mummy
Bangrene
Mo'Betta
Dicksome
D.C.
Devo Mummy
Yummy Mummy
Maniac Mummy
Hilfiger
Mandomum Mummy
Jerkamum Mummy
Crusty Mummy
Uncle Tuck
Wigglesworth
Hokiemum
Mummy Igor
Periphe

Discography

Studio albums 
Terrifying Funk from Beyond the Grave (2002)
Everlasting Party (2003)
Single Entendre (2008)
Carnal Carnival (2010)
Bed, Bath & Behind (2011)
Introducing the Tiny Tuts (2012)
Cryptic (2013)
Underground (2016)
A Blessing And A Curse (2016)
HOUSE PARTY (2022)

EPs 
A La Mode (2014)
Pull It Off (2014)
Shocker (2014)
MuertoDiesel (2014)

Live albums 
Undead Live (2009)
Rejuvannihilation (2013)
MMXV (2016)
All Excess (2018)

Compilation albums 
Hits & Mrs. (2012)
CuriosiTease Volume 1 (2013)
Threesome (2014)

Compilations 
Bob And Tom Dead Air Disc 2 (2009)
Fired Up! Original Motion Picture Soundtrack (2009)

Appearances 
The band's song "Dirty Minds" has been featured on the television shows Big Shots, The Loop, and Scrubs, as well as the movie Fired Up!, also appearing on the Fired Up!  official soundtrack.

In 2009 and again in 2010 the band played on the Bob and Tom morning show.  They have since become one of the show's favorite musical guests.

References

External links 
MySpace Page
Facebook Page
Last.FM

Musical groups established in 2000
American funk musical groups
Bands with fictional stage personas
Masked musicians
Funk rock musical groups